List of presidents of the Supreme Court of Costa Rica. 

Legend:

References

Law of Costa Rica
Chief justices by country
 
Presidents of the Supreme Court
Presidents of the Supreme Court